Carlos Clay de França (born 1 January 1980) is a Brazilian association football coach and former player.

Playing career
França played for Spanish side CE Europa. He scored a goal for the team to win a promotion to Tercera División in 2005. He suffered from a spinal tumor in 2006 that almost ended his football career. According to the footballer himself, he also played for Chicago Fire Premier and Chicago Storm. França scored a goal in the last group stage round in 2008 PDL season for Chicago Fire Premier against Michigan Bucks.

He was a player of Caperanese in 2009–10 season, which won Serie D promotion in 2010 from Eccellenza Liguria (Italian sixth highest level until 2014; top level of Liguria region).

Serie D clubs
França remained in the squad of Caperanese in 2010–11 Serie D season. In May 2011, he joined Bogliasco.

França joined Cuneo in 2014.

França joined Lecco in 2015. In the following season, he joined fellow Serie D club Triestina.

After winning the Serie D promotion playoffs with Triestina, França signed a new contract with the club on 7 July 2017. The promotion of Triestina was confirmed on 4 August. However, on 31 August 2017, he returned to Serie D for Potenza. França played twice for Triestina in 2017–18 Coppa Italia and once at 2017–18 Coppa Italia Serie C.

Potenza
França was a player for Potenza since mid-2017. The team won promotion to Serie C as 2017–18 Serie D Group H winner. He also scored 25 league goals that season, as the second in the topscorer table of that group.

Seregno
On 17 August 2020 he moved to Seregno.

In November he was sidelined due to a serious knee injury which required surgery.

RG Ticino
In August 2021, after having guided Seregno to Serie C as a head coach, França decided to accept an offer as a player for Serie D team RG Ticino. He successively left the club by the end of December and retired again from active football.

Coaching career
On 2 March 2021, whilst still recovering from injury, his club Seregno announced to have promoted França as head coach of the Serie D club. Under his tenure, Seregno managed to climb up the table and win promotion to Serie C with one game still in hand, thus bringing back the Lombardian club to professional football for the first time since 1982. Despite his successes, on 24 July 2021 Seregno announced França was not confirmed as head coach for the club's upcoming Serie C campaign.

Honours

Player
club
 Serie D group stage winner: 2015 (Cuneo)
 Serie D group stage runner-up and promotion playoffs winner: 2017 (Triestina)
 Eccellenza group stage runner-up (Liguria) and promotion playoffs winner: 2010 (Caperanese)
individual
 Serie D Group A topscorer: 2015 (Cuneo)
 Eccellenza Liguria topscorer: 2010 (Caperanese)

Manager
Seregno
 Serie D Girone B: 2020–21

Personal life
Cassiano Bodini is his brother-in-law.

References

External links
 
 

1980 births
Living people
Footballers from São Paulo (state)
Brazilian footballers
Brazilian football managers
Brazilian expatriate footballers
Chicago Fire U-23 players
CE Europa footballers
U.S. Triestina Calcio 1918 players
Potenza Calcio players
U.S. 1913 Seregno Calcio players
Serie C players
Serie D players
Association football forwards
Expatriate soccer players in the United States
Expatriate footballers in Spain
Expatriate footballers in Italy
Brazilian expatriate sportspeople in the United States
Brazilian expatriate sportspeople in Spain
Brazilian expatriate sportspeople in Italy
U.S.D. Lavagnese 1919 players